Ford Theatre was an American psychedelic rock band from Boston, Massachusetts, that were active between 1966 and 1971. Their sound was similar to other Boston-based psychedelic rock bands of the era, but more genuine.

History

The band formed from the members of The Continentals (Jimmy Altieri, John Mazzarelli, Robert Tamagni, and Butch Webster), who then recruited Harry Palmer and Joe Scott. Although they existed during the period, the group disassociates itself with the Bosstown Sound.

Ford Theatre was one of the most promising bands of the 1960s that were influenced by the bands such as the Kingsmen, the Beatles and the Byrds, although they recorded only two albums, both under the ABC Records label. The band's first album Trilogy for the Masses was produced by Bob Thiele in 1968. The album's band tracks were done at Fleetwood Studios in Revere, Massachusetts, and the vocals were at Capitol Studios in New York City. And a year later their second album Time Changes was produced by Bill Szymczyk  who later went on to produce the Eagles. The second album was done at the Hit Factory in New York City.

After 1969, the band disappeared from records and their memory was overshadowed by the more successful bands of the 1970s. In a recent interview Jimmy Altieri stated that after the release of Time Changes, the band didn't manage to get a new deal for a third album that was already partially recorded and the members decided to disband Ford Theatre in 1971.

Band members
 Harry Palmer - guitar
 John Mazzarelli - keyboards, vocals
 Butch Webster - lead guitar
 Joey Scott - lead vocals
 Jimmy Altieri - bass, vocals
 Robert Tamagni drums, vocals
 Wally Magee

Discography

Singles 
 "From a Back Door Window" b/w "Theme for the Masses" (ABC 11118) 1968
 "I've Got the Fever" b/w "Jefferson Airplane" (ABC 11227) 1969
 "Time Changes" b/w "Wake Up in the Morning" (Columbia(EMI) 1C006-90288) 1969
 "At the Station" b/w "Wake Up in the Morning" (Stateside 5C 006-90 589) 1969

Albums 
 Trilogy for the Masses (ABC ABCS-658) 1968
 Time Changes (ABC ABCS 681) 1969

References

External links
 "Exciting sound of Ford Theater". Beaver County Times. August 27, 1968.
 Ford Theatre in R. Stevie Moore HomePage

Musical groups established in 1966
Musical groups disestablished in 1971
American progressive rock groups
Psychedelic rock music groups from Massachusetts